KBMN-LD, virtual channel 40 and VHF digital channel 9, is a low-powered beIN Sports Xtra-affiliated television station licensed to Houston, Texas, United States. The station is owned by HC2 Holdings.

History 
The station's construction permit was issued on November 7, 2012 under the calls of K40NM-D. It changed to the current callsign of KBMN-LD on March 11, 2013.

Digital channels
The station's digital signal is multiplexed:

References

External links

Low-power television stations in the United States
Innovate Corp.
Television stations in Texas
Television channels and stations established in 2019
2019 establishments in Texas